Maple Ridge is a settlement in New Brunswick on Route 605.

History

Notable people

See also
List of communities in New Brunswick

References

Settlements in New Brunswick
Communities in York County, New Brunswick